Disneymania 5 is the 5th installment in the Disneymania series. It was released on March 27, 2007. The album features 4 of the stars from High School Musical: Vanessa Hudgens, Lucas Grabeel, Ashley Tisdale, Corbin Bleu and from High School Musical: The Concert, Drew Seeley among others. The album features other Disney-related stars as well. The album debuted on the Billboard 200 at 14 with a sales of 44,000 units, the highest debut for a Disneymania album to date. It has, since then, sold 293,000+ units.

Track listing

Critical reception

Allmusic said "Popular music stars belt out Disney songs in their signature styles on this extremely danceable disc. Four cast members from High School Musical add to the fun with "Two Worlds", "Colors of the Wind", "Kiss the Girl" and "Find Yourself", while B5 provides an exciting rendition of the "Siamese Cat Song." Fifteen tracks are included in total."

Charts
Disneymania 5 is the highest charting album of the series, peaking at #14, one position above Disneymania 4. However, it had the second lowest first week sales (behind Disneyremixmania).  To date, Disneymania 5 has sold a total amount of 190,104 copies.

Singles
"Kiss the Girl" - Ashley Tisdale - released to promote The Little Mermaid Special edition
"So This Is Love" - The Cheetah Girls
"The Second Star to the Right" - T-Squad - released to promote Peter Pan Platinum edition
"Colors of the Wind" - Vanessa Hudgens
"I Wanna Be Like You" - Jonas Brothers - released to promote The Jungle Book Platinum edition
"Go the Distance" - Lucas Grabeel

Music videos
"Kiss The Girl" - Ashley Tisdale
"So This is Love" - The Cheetah Girls
"The Second Star To The Right" - T-Squad
"I Wanna Be Like You" - Jonas Brothers

References

External links
 Disneymania Official site
 Sample tracks from Disneymania 5 as well as other Disney albums.

Disneymania albums
Walt Disney Records compilation albums
2007 compilation albums